Marian Gerard Jochman (2 February 1935 – 27 December 2020) was a Polish long-distance runner. He competed in the men's 5000 metres at the 1960 Summer Olympics.

References

External links
 

1935 births
2020 deaths
Athletes (track and field) at the 1960 Summer Olympics
Polish male long-distance runners
Olympic athletes of Poland
Sportspeople from Toruń
Zawisza Bydgoszcz athletes